The partimen (also known as partia or joc partit) is a cognate form of the French jeu-parti (plural jeux-partis). It is a genre of Occitan lyric poetry composed between two troubadours, a subgenre of the tenso or cobla exchange in which one poet presents a dilemma in the form of a question and the two debate the answer, each taking up a different side. Of the nearly 200 surviving Occitan debate songs, 120 are partimens and 75 are open tensos. The partimen was especially popular in poetic contests. See also Torneyamen.

References

Further reading
Alfred Jeanroy, Les origines de la poésie lyrique en France au Moyen-Age (Paris, 1899, 3/1925)
Alfred Jeanroy: La poésie lyrique des troubadours (Toulouse and Paris, 1934/R), ii, 247–81
Ruth Harvey, Linda M. Paterson and Anna Radaelli, eds.: The troubadour tensos and partimens: a critical edition (Cambridge, 2010).

Western medieval lyric forms
Occitan literary genres